Kelly Dae Wilson (born May 18, 1974) was an American teenager who went missing on January 5, 1992, from Gilmer, Texas.

Disappearance
Wilson was last seen at about 8:30 p.m. on January 5, 1992, as she was leaving her workplace to go to a nearby bank to deposit her paycheck, but she never returned home. The next morning her stepfather found her car at her workplace, and the tires had been slashed and were flat. Her belongings, including her purse, were inside the car, but her keys were missing. Wilson was last seen wearing a purple rugby shirt with red, gold and white insignia and white cuffs and collar, with stonewashed cutoff blue jeans with brown loafers, and she was wearing an assortment of rings.

Investigation and aftermath
The Wilson disappearance remains unsolved. A man named Michael Biby was eventually arrested as a suspect in the tire-slashing incident, but was considered to be not linked to Wilson's disappearance. Wilson's boyfriend at the time, Chris Denton, was named by police as a prime suspect in her disappearance, but he was never charged in the case; Denton died of cancer in 2004.

See also
List of people who disappeared

References

1990s missing person cases
1992 in Texas
Crimes in Texas
History of Texas
History of women in Texas
January 1992 events in the United States
Missing American children
Missing person cases in Texas